Theft by finding occurs when someone chances upon an object which seems abandoned and takes possession of the object but fails to take steps to establish whether the object is genuinely abandoned and not merely lost or unattended. In some jurisdictions  the crime is called "larceny by finding" or "stealing by finding".

If the owner has renounced all property rights in the object, then the property is abandoned. Since theft is the unlawful taking of another person's property, an essential element of the actus reus of theft is absent.

The finder of lost property acquires a possessory right by taking physical control of the property, but does not necessarily have ownership of the property. The finder must take reasonable steps to locate the owner. If the finder shows that reasonable steps to find the owner have been taken then the finder may establish that the required mens rea for theft, the intention to deprive the owner permanently, is absent. 

In discussing the history of finding, Alice Tay collected some cases (at footnote 36) where a finder raised an unsuccessful defence to larceny on the grounds that the circumstances of finding were such that no inquiry as to the true owner was required:  
 Lamb's Case (1694) 2 East, P. C. (London, 1803) 664 (driver of hackney carriage keeping articles and cases left behind by passengers)
 Wynne's Case (1786) 1 Leach 413, 168 E. R. 308, 2 East, P. C. 664 (facts as in Lamb's Case)
 R. v. Pope (1834) 6 C. & P. 346, 172 E. R. 1270 (prisoner picking up hat after brawl in passage of public house)
 R. v. Kerr (1837) 8 C. & P. 176, 173 E. R. 449 (servant keeping money picked up in passage of master's dwelling-house)
 R. v. Peters (1843) 1 C. & K. 245, 174 E. R. 795 (prisoner 'finding' valuable ornaments in garden of one who had employed him to do some work)
 R. v. West (1854) 6 Cox C. C. 417 (stall-keeper appropriating purse left on stall by customer)
 R. v. Moore (1861) L. & C. 1, 169 E. R. 1278 (barber-shop keeper converting banknote picked up on floor after a customer had purchased some hair oil)
and cases where the circumstances were held to show no larceny:
 R. v. Wood (1848) 3 Cox C. C. 277 (banknote found on open land)
 R. v. Dixon (1855) 7 Cox C. C. 35, 25 L. J. M. C. 39 (lost note without mark)
 R. v. Shea (1856) 7 Cox C. C. 147; R. v. Christopher (1858) Bell C. C. 27, 169 E. R. 1153 (unmarked notes and purse found in public place)
 R. v. Glyde (1868) 11 Cox C. C. 103 (sovereign found in high road)
 R. v. Deavis (1869) 11 Cox C. C. 227 (prisoner's child found six sovereigns in public place)

An issue may arise when a person takes possession of lost property with the intention of returning it to the owner after inquiry but later converts the property to the finder's use. This is illustrated by Thompson v. Nixon [1965] 3 W.L.R. 501: an off duty police constable found a bag of rabbit food lying by the roadside, took it home intending to hand it in as lost property but some time after decided to keep it for his own use. He was found guilty at first instance but his ultimate appeal to the Divisional Court was upheld. The appellate court held that, at the time of finding, there was no mens rea to support a conviction of larceny. In some jurisdictions this has been addressed by statute; see, for example, s. 124, Crimes Act 1900 (NSW) allowing a jury to reach an alternative verdict of "fraudulent appropriation".

Some have argued that finding should not be a province for the criminal law system but that any dispute as to ownership be left to resolution via a civil suit. Others have argued that the jurisprudence gives rise to legal fictions and strained reasoning which has attracted divergent statutory law reform in different jurisdictions.

References 

Theft
Law of the United States